Karachi University railway station (Sindhi: ڪراچي يونيورسٽي اسٽيشن) is located in Pakistan. It is located near the University of Karachi.

See also
 List of railway stations in Pakistan
 Pakistan Railways

References

External links

Railway stations in Karachi
Railway stations on Karachi Circular Railway